The Carlisle Grounds is a football stadium in Bray, County Wicklow, Ireland. Situated directly behind the Bray D.A.R.T. station, it is home to Bray Wanderers A.F.C.

History
The Carlisle Grounds can claim to be the Football Association of Ireland ground with the longest history as a sports venue. Opened in 1862 as the Bray Athletic Ground, it was renamed the Carlisle Cricket and Archery Ground later that year, in honour of the 7th Earl of Carlisle who performed the opening ceremony as Lord Lieutenant of Ireland. Later it was shortened to the Carlisle Grounds.

A new stand seating 985 was constructed in 2006 bring the seating capacity of the ground up to about 2,000. The League of Ireland side Transport F.C. played at the Carlisle Grounds from 1948-1951 before moving to Harold's Cross Stadium. In July 2009 a section of the wall around the pitch collapsed after Shamrock Rovers fans rushed down to the wall to celebrate a goal.  The following year another section of the wall fell as a result of fans rushing forward, this time while hosting their league promotion playoff against Monaghan United, prompting an FAI investigation. The Carlisle Grounds hosted a 2011 UEFA Regions' Cup match. The Carlisle Grounds also hosted two match's in the 2015 UEFA Regions' Cup.

Rugby League
Ireland played against Belgium in an international friendly on Sunday 12 July 2015 winning the match 34–0. 7 November 2015 saw the Carlisle Grounds host the match between Ireland and Wales as part of the 2015 European Cup.

References in popular culture
The Carlisle Grounds was used in the filming of the Bloody Sunday scene in the 1996 film Michael Collins. The ground was also used as a filming location for the music video of singer Dermot Kennedy's single "Outnumbered".

Future redevelopment
In October 2009, details were released of a planned large scale redevelopment of the ground. This would involve a new stadium being built on the site as well as a major retailer moving in. A scale model of the redevelopment was displayed on the club's website around this time.

Bibliography

References

External links
 Official website of Bray Wanderers A.F.C.
 Carlisle Grounds

Bray Wanderers F.C.
Buildings and structures in Bray, County Wicklow
Association football venues in the Republic of Ireland
Sports venues in County Wicklow
Rugby league stadiums in Ireland
Transport F.C.